Ginette Anfousse (born May 27, 1944) is a Quebec writer and illustrator of children's books.

Life 
She was born in Montreal and was educated at the École des beaux-arts de Montréal. She also studied engraving at the Atelier Graff in Montreal and the Atelier de l'Île in Val-David. Anfousse worked as a visual designer for Radio Canada from 1968 to 1970 and for Radio Quebec from 1970 to 1975. In 1978, she founded her own design company.

Her first stories Mon Ami Pichou and La Cachette were published in 1976. She has also contributed to the magazines Perspectives, Lurelu and Livre d'ici.

Anfousse has received the Children's Literature prize from the Canada Council twice: for La Chicane and La Varicelle (1979) and Un Loup pour Rose and Une Nuit au pays des malices (1983). In 1987, she was awarded the Prix Fleury-Mesplet for her work.

Many of her books have been translated into English; some have been translated into Italian, German, Spanish and Chinese.

Selected works 
 La Chicane (1979), included on the Honour List of the International Board on Books for Young People in Prague
 Le Savon (1980)
 L'Hiver ou le Bonhomme Sept-heures (1980)
  Les Catastrophes de Rosalie (1987), received the Prix Québec-Wallonie-Bruxelles, finalist for the Governor General's Awards in 1987
 Rosalie s'en va-t-en guerre (1989), received the Mr. Christie's Book Award
 Un Terrible secret (1991), finalist for the Governor General's Awards in 1991
 Rosalie à la belle étoile (1998)

References

External links 

 
  Archives of Ginette Anfousse (Fonds Ginette Anfousse, R11698) are held at Library and Archives Canada

1944 births
Living people
Artists from Montreal
Canadian children's writers in French
Canadian children's book illustrators
Canadian women artists
Canadian women children's writers
École des beaux-arts de Montréal alumni
Writers from Montreal
20th-century Canadian women writers